The Beautiful Violin is a play by Adam Strickson. Written in the Jatra (Bengal) style, it takes place during the 19th century in rural Bangladesh and tells the story of a tragic romance. It was co-commissioned by Peshkar Productions and the Oldham Coliseum Theatre. It was nominated for the Best New Play category at the Manchester Evening News Theatre Awards of 2002.

Original tour

The piece was directed by Iain Bloomfield and toured nationally to the following venues in 2002:

 Oldham Coliseum Theatre
 Contact Theatre
 Nuffield Theatre, Southampton
 The Bradford Alhambra
 Meredith Studio, Huddersfield
 The Square Chapel, Halifax

Cast

 Ahad Ullah
 Balvinder Sopal - Bhelua
 Everal Walsh - Vivek
 Perveen Hussain
 Jaleel Akhtar
 Ross Millar

References

External links
 Peshkar's official website
 Peshkar's Arts Council profile 
 Interview with Adam Strickson
 Review of the play by Dominic Rai 

British plays
English plays